Čumil is the second album by the Slovak punk rock band Iné Kafe, released on 4 October 1999.

Track listing

Personnel
 Vratko Rohoň - vocals, guitar
 Mario "Wayo" Praženec - bass
 Jozef "Dodo" Praženec - drums

Guest artists
 YXO - bass (9), backing vocals (1, 2, 7, 8, 11)
 Peter Opet - trumpet (5, 7)
 Gabriela Lachkovičová - saxophone (5, 7)
 Tomáš and Jopo - scratching (2)
 Roman "Fernet" Slávik - backing vocals (2, 3, 5, 6, 12, 13)
 Jozef "Kecka" Horváth - vocals (?)
 Sanchez - guitar solo (?)

References

1999 albums
Iné Kafe albums